Robert Lang McDonald  (21 April 1933 – 22 February 2006) was a New Zealand lawn bowls player who competed at four Commonwealth Games, winning gold, silver and bronze medals in the men's pairs.

Bowls career
At the 1962 British Empire and Commonwealth Games in Perth, Western Australia, he won the men's pairs gold medal partnering Robbie Robson. Eight years later he won the silver medal again with Robson in the pairs at the 1970 Commonwealth Games. In 1974 he claimed his last Commonwealth Games medal with a bronze in the men's pairs. He also competed in the 1978 Commonwealth Games. 

In addition to international success McDonald won the 1962 pairs title with Frank Livingstone and the 1973 fours title at the Australian National Bowls Championships when bowling for the Onehunga Bowls Club.

Honours and awards
McDonald was awarded the Queen's Service Medal for community service in the 2002 New Year Honours. He died in Auckland on 22 February 2006.

In 2013, McDonald was an inaugural inductee into the Bowls New Zealand Hall of Fame.

References

1933 births
2006 deaths
New Zealand male bowls players
Commonwealth Games gold medallists for New Zealand
Commonwealth Games silver medallists for New Zealand
Commonwealth Games bronze medallists for New Zealand
Bowls players at the 1962 British Empire and Commonwealth Games
Bowls players at the 1970 British Commonwealth Games
Bowls players at the 1974 British Commonwealth Games
Recipients of the Queen's Service Medal
Commonwealth Games medallists in lawn bowls
20th-century New Zealand people
21st-century New Zealand people
Medallists at the 1962 British Empire and Commonwealth Games
Medallists at the 1970 British Commonwealth Games
Medallists at the 1974 British Commonwealth Games